House of Bondioni was a most important family for Niardo and Val Camonica. Bondioni is the surname of a family of Italian noble background.

History
The dynasty was founded by Giovan Maria Bondioni (1600–60), he was a condottiero from Niardo.
In 1630 to fight the Landsknecht, Giovanni Maria Bondioni sat at the head of a citizen army to stop the mercenaries sent by Ferdinand II, Holy Roman Emperor.

Tradition
Tradition says that the family has origins dating back to ancient Greece.
The myth has it that it was Diomedes, son of Tydeus and Deipyle, to found the family, after his marriage to Aigialeia.

Notable members

 Giovan Maria Bondioni (1600–60), Condottiero of 17th century
 Giovanni Bondioni (1802–75), Major of Niardo in 1830
 Giovanni Bondioni (1894–1918), Lieutenant of 82º Regiment of Foot "Torino" in World War I

Italian families
Italian noble families